The Bjorck Family (Swedish: Familjen Björck) is a 1940 Swedish comedy film directed by Anders Henrikson and starring Olof Winnerstrand, Frida Winnerstrand and Birgitta Arman. It was shot at the Centrumateljéerna Studios in Stockholm. The film's sets were designed by the art director Arthur Spjuth. It was based on a radio show of the same name that ran from 1936 to 1943.

Synopsis
The Björck family are a respectable middle-class Stockholm household. However the daughter Greta is showing interest in an unsuitable boyfriend while ignoring a more clean-cut suitor while her father is being pursued by the seductive Astrid Holten.

Cast
 Olof Winnerstrand as 	Ingeniör Björck
 Frida Winnerstrand as 	Fru Björck
 Birgitta Arman as 	Greta, deras dotter
 Åke Johansson as 	Ville, deras son
 Margit Manstad as 	Astrid Holten
 Carin Swensson as 	Hulda 
 Gull Natorp as Tant Inga
 Carl-Axel Hallgren as Bertil
 Ulf Westman as 	Börje Schack
 Carl-Gunnar Wingård as 	Karlgren
 Anna-Lisa Baude as Fröken Widén
 Artur Rolén as Edvin Holten
 Gerda Björne as Irma 
 Åke Claesson as 	Karl 
 Julie Bernby as Miss Engström
 Georg Funkquist as 	Ladies' Hairdresser
 Harry Roeck Hansen as 	Algot
 Viran Rydkvist as Woman at Dog Show 
 Frithiof Bjärne as 	Doorman at Scala

References

Bibliography 
 Qvist, Per Olov & von Bagh, Peter. Guide to the Cinema of Sweden and Finland. Greenwood Publishing Group, 2000.

External links 
 

1940 films
Swedish comedy films
1940 comedy films
1940s Swedish-language films
Films directed by Anders Henrikson
Swedish black-and-white films
Films set in Stockholm
1940s Swedish films